Pengkalan Kundor is a state constituency in Kedah, Malaysia, that has been represented in the Kedah State Legislative Assembly.

Demographics

History

Polling districts 
According to the gazette issued on 30 March 2018, the Pengkalan Kundor constituency has a total of 17 polling districts.

Representation history

Election results

References

Kedah state constituencies